The 2015–16 Eurocup Basketball Regular Season was played from 13 October to 16 December 2015. A total of 36 teams competed in the group stage to decide the 24 places in the Last 32 with the 8 places dropped from the Euroleague Regular Season.

Format

Tiebreakers
If teams are level on record at the end of the Regular Season, tiebreakers are applied in the following order:
 Head-to-head record.
 Head-to-head point differential.
 Point differential during the Regular Season.
 Points scored during the regular season.
 Sum of quotients of points scored and points allowed in each Regular Season match.

Groups

Conference 1

Group A

Group B

Group C

Conference 2

Group D

Group E

Group F

External links
Official website

2015–16 Eurocup Basketball